The 32nd Lo Nuestro Awards ceremony, presented and televised by American television network Univision y Las Estrellas, recognized the most popular Spanish-language music of 2019 that was played on Uforia Audio Network during the year in 35 categories. The ceremony was hold on February 20, 2020 at the American Airlines Arena in Miami. The ceremony was hosted by American rapper Pitbull, Mexican singer Thalía, and model Alejandra Espinoza with each one being their first time hosting.

Special Merit Awards
Musical legacy award: Alejandro Fernandez
Global Icon Award: J Balvin
Excellence Award: Raphael

Winners and nominees
The nominees for the 32nd Lo Nuestro Awards were announced digitally on January 14, 2020 by Univision.

References

2020 music awards
2020 awards in the United States
Lo Nuestro Awards by year
2020 in Latin music